Romanisation of Bengali is the representation of written Bengali language in the Latin script. Various romanisation systems for Bengali are used, most of which do not perfectly represent Bengali pronunciation. While different standards for romanisation have been proposed for Bengali, none has been adopted with the same degree of uniformity as Japanese or Sanskrit.

The Bengali script has been included with the group of Indic scripts whose romanisation does not represent the phonetic value of Bengali. Some of them are the "International Alphabet of Sanskrit Transliteration" or IAST system (based on diacritics), "Indian languages Transliteration" or ITRANS (uses upper case alphabets suited for ASCII keyboards), and the National Library at Calcutta romanisation.

In the context of Bengali romanisation, it is important to distinguish transliteration from transcription. Transliteration is orthographically accurate (the original spelling can be recovered), but transcription is phonetically accurate (the pronunciation can be reproduced). English does not have all sounds of Bengali, and pronunciation does not completely reflect orthography.  The aim of romanisation is not the same as phonetic transcription.  Rather, romanisation is a representation of one writing system in Roman (Latin) script.  If Bengali script has "ত" and Bengalis pronounce it /to/ there is nevertheless an argument based on writing-system consistency for transliterating it as "त" or "ta."   The writing systems of most languages do not faithfully represent the spoken sound of the language, as famously with English words like "enough," "women," or "nation" (see "ghoti").

History
Portuguese missionaries stationed in Bengal in the 16th century were the first people to employ the Latin alphabet in writing Bengali books. The most famous are the Crepar Xaxtrer Orth, Bhed and the Vocabolario em idioma Bengalla, e Portuguez dividido em duas partes, both written by Manuel da Assumpção. However, the Portuguese-based romanisation did not take root. In the late 18th century, Augustin Aussant used a romanisation scheme based on the French alphabet. At the same time, Nathaniel Brassey Halhed used a romanisation scheme based on English for his Bengali grammar book. After Halhed, the renowned English philologist and oriental scholar Sir William Jones devised a romanisation scheme for Bengali and other Indian languages in general; he published it in the Asiatick Researches journal in 1801. His scheme came to be known as the "Jonesian system" of romanisation and served as a model for the next century and a half. Professor Lightner of Lahore Government College opposed it. 

100 years after that i.e. at the beginning of the 20th century, Drew, an assistant professor at Eton College recommended that Indian languages be written in Roman script and for this purpose the magazine called Roman Urdu was launched.

Abul Fazal Muhammad Akhtaru-d-Din, in an article titled "Bangla Bornomalar Poribortton" (বাংলা বর্ণমালার পরিবর্ত্তন, Changes in the Bengali Alphabet) published in Daily Azad on April 18, 1949, said, Rabindranath Tagore once advocated the Roman alphabet for Bengali, but later he changed his opinion.

Bengali language movement
During the Bengali Language Movement of the 1940s–50s, Romanization of Bengali was proposed along with other proposals regarding the determination of the state language of the then Pakistan, but like other proposals it also failed, by establishing Bengali as one of the state languages ​​of Pakistan at that time, with its traditional letters. After 1947, many other East Pakistani academics, including Muhammad Qudrat-i-Khuda and Nazirul Islam Mohammad Sufian, supported the idea of writing Bengali in Roman script. In 1948, Mohammad Ferdous Khan opposed it in his pamphlet "The language problem of today".  

Abul Fazl Muhammad Akhtar-ud-Din supported the Roman alphabet in his article entitled "Bangla Bornomalar Poribortton" (বাংলা বর্ণমালার পরিবর্ত্তন, Changes in the Bengali Alphabet) published in Daily Azad on 18 April 1949.

At 1949, Language Committee of the East-Bengal Government conducted a survey among teachers, intellectuals, high civil servants, members of the Legislative Council, according to which, out of 301 respondents, 96 favored the introduction of the Arabic script, 18 the Roman script and 187 the retention of the Bengali script.  Give opinion in favor. Besides, many people did not give any answer.

After language movement
In 1957, the East Pakistan Education Commission recommended the use of the revised Roman script in adult education.

Around 1957-58, there was a significant demand for the use of Roman letters again.  At that time Muhammad Abdul Hai and Muhammad Enamul Haque opposed it.

Transliteration and transcription
Romanisation of a language written in a non-Roman script can be based on either transliteration (orthographically accurate and the original spelling can be recovered) or transcription (phonetically accurate, and the pronunciation can be reproduced). The distinction is important in Bengali, as its orthography was adopted from Sanskrit and ignores several millennia of sound change. All writing systems differ at least slightly from the way the language is pronounced, but this is more extreme for languages like Bengali. For example, the three letters শ, ষ, and স had distinct pronunciations in Sanskrit, but over several centuries, the standard pronunciation of Bengali (usually modelled on the Nadia dialect) has lost the phonetic distinctions, and all three are usually pronounced as IPA . The spelling distinction persists in orthography.

In written texts, distinguishing between homophones, such as শাপ shap "curse" and সাপ shap "snake", is easy. Such a distinction could be particularly relevant in searching for the term in an encyclopaedia, for example. However, the fact that the words sound identical means that they would be transcribed identically, so some important distinctions of meaning cannot be rendered by transcription. Another issue with transcription systems is that cross-dialectal and cross-register differences are widespread, so the same word or lexeme may have many different transcriptions. Even simple words like মন "mind" may be pronounced "mon", "môn", or (in poetry) "mônô" (as in the Indian national anthem, "Jana Gana Mana").

Often, different phonemes are represented by the same symbol or grapheme. Occasionally, words written in the same way (homographs) may have different pronunciations for differing meanings: মত can mean "opinion" (pronounced môt), or "similar to" (môtô). Therefore, some important phonemic distinctions cannot be rendered in a transliteration model. In addition, to represent a Bengali word to allow speakers of other languages to pronounce it easily, it may be better to use a transcription, which does not include the silent letters and other idiosyncrasies (স্বাস্থ্য sbasthyô, spelled <swāsthya>, or অজ্ঞান ôggên, spelled <ajñāna>) that make Bengali romanisation so complicated. Such letters are misleading in a phonetic romanisation of Bengali and are a result of often inclusion of the Bengali script with other Indic scripts for romanisation, but the other Indic scripts lack the inherent vowel ô, which causes chaos for Bengali romanisation.

A phenomenon in which romanisation of Bengali unintentionally leads to humorous results when translated is known as Murad Takla.

Comparison of romanisations
Comparisons of the standard romanisation schemes for Bengali are given in the table below. Two standards are commonly used for transliteration of Indic languages, including Bengali. Many standards (like NLK/ISO), use diacritic marks and permit case markings for proper nouns.  Schemes such as the Harvard-Kyoto one are more suited for ASCII-derivative keyboards and use upper- and lower-case letters contrastively, so forgo normal standards for English capitalisation.

 "NLK" stands for the diacritic-based letter-to-letter transliteration schemes, best represented by the National Library at Kolkata romanisation or the ISO 15919, or IAST. It is the ISO standard, and it uses diacritic marks like ā to reflect the additional characters and sounds of Bengali letters.
 ITRANS is an ASCII representation for Sanskrit; it is one-to-many:  more than one way of transliterating characters may be used, which can make internet searches more complicated. ITRANS ignores English capitalisation norms to permit representing characters from a normal ASCII keyboard.
 "HK" stands for two other case-sensitive letter-to-letter transliteration schemes: Harvard-Kyoto and XIAST scheme. Both are similar to the ITRANS scheme and use only one form for each character.

Vowels

Consonants

Additional Consonants

Examples
The following table includes examples of Bengali words romanised by using the various systems mentioned above.

A detailed example is given below by the lyrics of the "" as written by Rabindranath Tagore, the first ten lines of this song currently constitute Bangladesh's national anthem.

See also 
 Dobhashi
 Roman Urdu
 Romanization of Arabic
 Devanagari transliteration
 Maltese language - a romanised language form of Classical Arabic language
 Fiji Hindi - a romanised language form of Hindi language

Notes

References

Bengali script
Alphabet
Languages of Bangladesh
Bengali